Willowdale is a residential neighborhood in Cherry Hill, New Jersey, United States.

References

Neighborhoods in Cherry Hill, New Jersey